The Centenary of Women's Suffrage mural is located in the town of Lake Grace, Western Australia. It honours 48 women who contributed to the development of the area from the time of white colonisation until the present day.

The mural was painted in 1998 by a group of local artists as part of commemorations for the centenary of women's suffrage in the State of Western Australia. It was funded by a grant from the state's fund for women's suffrage commemorations. It depicts women from a range of backgrounds, including settlers, community builders, professionals, homemakers, activists, farmers and students.

See also
 List of monuments and memorials to women's suffrage
 Suffrage in Australia

References

Monuments and memorials to pioneer women
Monuments and memorials to women's suffrage
Public art in Western Australia
1990s murals